HTS Teologiese Studies/Theological Studies in Afrikaans; previously also known as Hervormde Teologiese Studies) is a peer-reviewed academic journal covering interfaith theological research. It has a broad scope, publishing on aspects of religious studies, philosophy, ancient languages, practical theology, sociology, and ethics. In 2009, the journal Practical Theology in South Africa was merged into Theological Studies, which became an official journal of the Society for Practical Theology in South Africa.

The journal is abstracted and indexed in the Arts and Humanities Citation Index, Scopus, and SciELO.

See also
 Open access in South Africa

External links 
 

1942 establishments in South Africa
Afrikaans-language journals
English-language journals
Multilingual journals
Publications established in 1942
Religious studies journals
Triannual journals